Fatih Kırtorun (born 1985, Görele, Giresun) is a  Turkish poet and translator.

Personal life 
Born in Giresun, Görele, he moved to İstanbul and attended primary and high school in this city. He studied the English Language and Literature.

Poetry
He published his poem "Yitik Sayfalar Bilmecesi" (Lost Pages' Puzzle) in Varlık in 2006. He wrote a poem devoted to Bilge Karasu named "Öldürsen (G)e(ce)" (Night Tale)  in Sözcükler. He took part in the Contemporary Turkish Language Magazine with his poem "Gölgesizlik". (Shadowless)  He penned poems in Koridor Literary Magazine. He also publishes works in several literary magazines and reviews.

Short stories
One of his early works a short story was translated into Greek at Democritus University of Thrace and also used as a text material in a dissertation at the same university.

External links 
 Varlık Literary Magazine issue: February 2006
 Sözcükler Magazine and His Page
 His Page in Koridor Review

Notes

Turkish poets
1985 births
Living people
Turkish translators